Star Fox is a video game written by Bruce de Graaf for the Atari 2600 console and published by Mythicon in 1983.

Gameplay
The game takes place in the year 4024 AD. The story begins as a robot freighter carrying a cargo of extremely valuable trimetalisium energy crystals crash lands on the planetoid Beta-7. An enemy star cruiser, escorted by a squadron of fighter drones, is en route to the planetoid to seize the crystals.

The player's objective is to recover the crystals before the enemy while doing battle with the fighter drones.

Reception
In a Digital Press article on the worst games for the Atari 2600, Star Fox was ranked nineteenth:

References

External links
Star Fox at Atari Mania

1983 video games
Atari 2600 games
Atari 2600-only games
Multiplayer video games
Video games developed in the United States